Prince Edward County Wine is produced in Prince Edward County (PEC) located in south eastern part of southern Ontario, the most southerly part of Canada.  Prince Edward County was designated as the fourth and newest Designated Viticultural Area (DVA) in Ontario in 2007.  A DVA is a wine-producing region for which rules and regulations are set down by the Vintners Quality Alliance (VQA) of Ontario.  VQA Ontario is an organization officially delegated by the government of Ontario to administer and enforce the Vintners Quality Alliance Act, 1999  There are currently some 42 commercial wineries (as of 2015) and over 50 wine grape growers in Prince Edward County, cultivating more than 700 acres (280 hectares) of vineyard, producing 757 tons of grapes and 6130 hectolitres of wine annually (as of 2007).

History
Since Prince Edward County (locally known as "The County") was first settled in the 1780s by United Empire Loyalists fleeing the American Revolution, it has been known for its agricultural products, initially grains (especially barley) and later tender fruits — at one time it supplied one third of all canned produce in Canada.  In the late twentieth century the PEC canning industry disappeared as the greater part of the fruit and vegetables sold in Canada are now imported.  However, the twenty-first century is witnessing the establishment of a new high value agricultural industry in the County:  wine growing, i.e. viticulture along with wine making.

The first wine grapes were planted in the mid-nineteenth century and achieved some renown when Dorland Nixon was awarded a gold medal for his wine at the 1876 Philadelphia Exposition.  The modern era began when Phil Matheson planted an experimental vineyard with vinifera grapes in the 1980s while Ed Neuser and Rita Kaimins established the first commercial vinifera vineyard for their Waupoos Estates Winery in 1993.  They were granted the second winery licence in the County (after Grant Howes and the County Cider Company in 1996) and opened their winery in 2001.  During the first decade of the twenty-first century, new wineries have emerged at a furious pace, with approximately 30 in operation in 2010.

The éminence grise behind the establishment of the County wine industry is Geoff Heinricks, who was the first to propose that Prince Edward County could one day be a major player in the Canadian wine industry.  He thoroughly investigated the soils and microclimates of the County and concluded that the cool climate coupled with the all-pervading limestone base would be an ideal situation for the grapes of Burgundy (i.e. Pinot noir and Chardonnay).  He also provided some other strong recommendations including the various relatives and clones of Pinot noir (Pinot gris, Pinot blanc, and Pinot Meunier), St. Laurent, Melon de Bourgogne, Gamay, and Riesling, and has given serious consideration to several others.  He described his endeavours in a popular book as well as a monograph that is available on line.  Geoff and two partners eventually opened the Keint-he Winery, although he was dismissed and replaced in 2011 after harvest.

Wineries
The majority of County wineries are in the west central region, particularly in Hillier Ward where the Hillier Clay Loam soil formation is predominant.  According to Geoff Heinricks, this soil is thin and composed mostly of a mix of limestone and shale gravel; it encourages the vine roots to reach deep into the underlying limestone where they are then assured of good access to both water and drainage.  Most of the other wineries are more widely dispersed over the eastern and southeastern regions of the County.  They are planted in a variety of complex soils, but all lie atop limestone bedrock at various layers, gifting the limestone subsoil.  The situations of many, but not all, of the wineries are summarized on the County viticultural map.  Some wineries may be too new to be on the map and others may not belong to the PECWA.
All known wineries, arranged by region, are listed below.

Hillier 
 Broken Stone Winery
 By Chadsey's Cairns Winery
 Casa-Dea Estates Winery 
 Closson Chase Vineyards
 Domaine Darius
 Gravel Hill Vineyards
 The Grange of Prince Edward Vineyards and Winery
 Harwood Estate Vineyards
 Hillier Creek Estates
 Hinterland Wine Company
 Hubbs Creek Vineyard
 Karlo Estates
 Keint-he Winery and Vineyards
 Lacey Estates Winery
 Lift Haus Winery (Closed)
 Norman Hardie Winery
 Redtail Vineyard
 Rosehall Run Vineyards
 Sandbanks Estate Winery
 Stanners Vineyard
 Sugarbush Vineyards
 Terra Estate Winery
 The Old Third Vineyard
 Three Dog Winery
Trail Estate Winery
 Traynor Family Vineyard

Central 
 Barnyard Wine Company (aka 3630 Wines) (Closed)
 Black Prince Winery
 Huff Estates Winery
 TerraCello Winery

East 
 Bergeron Estate Winery & Cider Co.
 Cape Vineyards
 County Cider Company
 Del-Gatto Estates
 The Devil's Wishbone Winery
 Half Moon Bay Winery
 Thirty Three Vines Winery (aka 33 Vines Winery)
 Three Dog Wine
 Waupoos Estates Winery

South 
 Exultet Estates
 Half Moon Bay Winery
 Lighthall Vineyards
 Long Dog Winery
 On the 8th County Winery (moribund at least in 2014)

Vineyards
There are also a number of vineyards that grow wine grapes but do not have their own winery.  This table lists many of the most prominent such vineyards, but it is not comprehensive and may include some that are no longer active.

References

External links
 Wine Country Ontario
 Ontario Craft Wineries
 Prince Edward County Winegrowers Association (PECWA)

Wineries of Ontario
Canadian wine
Canadian alcoholic drinks
Prince Edward County, Ontario